The Charles Juhre House is a historic house at 406 North 4th Street in Rogers, Arkansas.  It is a brick American Foursquare house, two stories in height, with a front porch extending across the full width of the building.  A polygonal window projection occupies the center bay on the second floor, and there is a large gable dormer with a Palladian window projecting above it from the hip roof.  The house was designed by local architect A. O. Clark, and is a fine local example of transitional Colonial and Classical Revival style.

The house was listed on the National Register of Historic Places in 1993.

See also
National Register of Historic Places listings in Benton County, Arkansas

References

Houses on the National Register of Historic Places in Arkansas
Colonial Revival architecture in Arkansas
Neoclassical architecture in Arkansas
Houses completed in 1908
Houses in Rogers, Arkansas
National Register of Historic Places in Benton County, Arkansas
1908 establishments in Arkansas